San Blas, the Spanish name for Saint Blaise, may refer to:

Places

Argentina 
 San Blas de los Sauces, in La Rioja Province
 San Blas, La Rioja, in La Rioja Province
 San Blas de los Sauces Department, in La Rioja Province

Bulgaria 
 Sveti Vlas (Свети Влас), Burgas Province

Ecuador 
 San Blas, Quito

Malta 
 San Blas, Nadur

Mexico 
 San Blas, Nayarit
 San Blas Atempa, Oaxaca
 San Blas, Baja California Sur
 Marismas Nacionales-San Blas mangroves, an ecoregion

Panama 
 Guna Yala, an autonomous territory, formerly called San Blas
 San Blas Islands, off the Caribbean coast 
 San Blas Range, a mountain range

Paraguay 
 San Blas (Asunción)

Puerto Rico 
 Church San Blas de Illescas of Coamo

Peru 
 San Blas (Cusco), a neighbourhood in the historic city centre of Cusco

Spain 
 San Blas (Madrid), a district of Madrid
San Blas (Madrid Metro), a station on Line 7
 Church of San Blas (Villarrobledo)

United States 
 Cape San Blas, part of a peninsula in Gulf County, Florida

See also
 San Blas jay, a bird of Mexico
 Blas (disambiguation)